Talmi-Teshub was "the great-great-great-grandson of Suppiluliuma I" and a viceroy at Carchemish in Syria under Suppiluliuma II. According to royal seal impressions found at Lidar Höyük found in 1985 on the east bank of the Euphrates river, Talmi-Teshub was succeeded by his own son, Kuzi-Teshub.

References

Hittite viceroys of Carchemish
12th-century BC rulers